Kunkuri is a town in Chhattisgarh, India. It is a tehsil of Jashpur district.

Geography

Transport
Three roads out of this township lead to the Bihar, Jharkhand and Odisha states of India. It is situated at the intersection of NH-78 and NH-43.

Demographics
Per the 2011 census, the population of Kunkuri town is 13,846.

References

External links
Jashpur District website

Cities and towns in Jashpur district